Boltwoodite is a hydrated potassium uranyl silicate mineral with formula HK(UO2)(SiO4)·1.5(H2O). It is formed from the oxidation and alteration of primary uranium ores. It takes the form of a crust on some sandstones that bear uranium. These crusts tend to be yellowish with a silky or vitreous luster.

Discovery and occurrence

It was first described in 1956 for an occurrence in Pick's Delta Mine, Delta, San Rafael District (San Rafael Swell), Emery County, Utah, US. It is named after Bertram Boltwood (1870–1927) an American pioneer of radiochemistry.

Boltwoodite occurs as secondary silicate alteration crusts surrounding uraninite and as fracture fillings. It is found in pegmatites and sandstone uranium deposits of the Colorado Plateau-type. It occurs associated with uraninite, becquerelite, fourmarierite, phosphouranylite, gypsum and fluorite.

References

Uranium(VI) minerals
Monoclinic minerals
Minerals in space group 11